Mohammed Rateb Al-Nabulsi (January 29, 1939) is a Syrian writer, professor, Islamic scholar, and Co-founder & manager (Nabulsi Encyclopedia of Islamic Science). He was a professor at Damascus University. He was living in Syria but after the Syrian Revolution started in 2011, he went to Jordan.

Education
He was raised in Damascus and studied in its schools. After he graduated from high school, he started studying at the faculty of Arts in Damascus University to study Arabic language, he graduated in 1964 with Licentiate degree .
In 1966 he got a diploma in Educational qualification. 
Then he got a master's degree in Arabic arts from University of Lyon .
And got Doctorate degree in Education from University of Dublin , in 1999.

Books
He wrote dozens of books, such as:

Books translated from Arabic to English 

 Reviews in Islam, .
 Reflections on Islam, .
 Bright words and productive meetings with Al Shaarawy, (Arabic: كلمات مضيئة ولقاءات مثمرة مع الشعراوي).
 Encyclopedia of the names of Allah,, in three Books.
 Creed and Quran Miraculousness (in Arabic: العقيدة والإعجاز).
 Constituents of Divine Assignment (in Arabic: مقومات التكليف).
 Ramadan Fatwas (in Arabic: فتاوى رمضان).
 The book of Hajj-Allah is the Greatest- secrets of Hajj (in Arabic: رحلة الحج- الله أكبر- حكم وأسرار).
 Encyclopedia of Scientific I'jaz (inimitability) in Al-Quran and Sunnah, in Two books, which are:
 The miracles of God in human آيات الله في الإنسان
 The miracles of God in Universe آيات الله في الآفاق

Books in Arabic
 Isra and Miraj, .
 The Hijra, . 
 God is the Greatest, .

On TV
He made hundreds of lectures on different TV channels, such as Iqraa TV, Syria TV, Cham TV, Addounia TV, Al-Resalah TV, Infinity TV, Future TV

He had lots of lectures and series on TV channels, for example: “Anouar Al Quran (the Quran lights)” series, and “Ala Al-Houda (On the right guidance)”.

See also

 Islam in Syria.
 Qur'an and science
 Qur'an miracles
 Abdul Majeed al-Zindani
 Zaghloul El-Naggar
 I'jaz In Islam.

References

 nabulsi biography

External links
 
  – 
 Playlist of his lecturers – on fawaed.tv 

Living people
Syrian Muslim scholars of Islam
Damascus University alumni
1939 births
Alumni of Trinity College Dublin
Syrian writers